A large and devastating multiple-vortex tornado struck Joplin, Missouri on the evening of Sunday, May 22, 2011. Part of a larger late-May tornado outbreak, the EF5 tornado began just west of Joplin and intensified very quickly, reaching a maximum width of nearly  during its path through the southern part of the city. The tornado tracked eastward through Joplin, and then continued across I-44 into rural portions of Jasper and Newton counties, weakening before it dissipated.

The tornado devastated a large portion of the city of Joplin, damaging nearly 8,000 buildings, and of those, destroying nearly 4,000. The damage—which included major facilities like one of Joplin's two hospitals as well as much of its basic infrastructure—amounted to a total of $2.8 billion, making the Joplin tornado the costliest single tornado in U.S. history. The insurance payout was the highest in Missouri history, with the previous record of $2 billion being the April 10, 2001 hail storm.

Overall, the tornado killed 158 people (with an additional eight indirect deaths), and injured some 1,150 others. Along with the 1925 Tri-State tornado and the 1896 St. Louis–East St. Louis tornado, the Joplin tornado ranks as one of Missouri's and the United States' deadliest tornadoes. It was the deadliest U.S. tornado since the April 9, 1947 F5 tornado in Woodward, Oklahoma, and the seventh-deadliest in U.S. history. It was the deadliest tornado in Missouri history, as well as the first single tornado since the June 8, 1953 F5 tornado in Flint, Michigan, to have 100+ associated fatalities. It was the first F5/EF5 tornado to occur in Missouri since May 20, 1957, when an F5 tornado destroyed several suburbs of Kansas City, and only the second F5/EF5 tornado in Missouri since 1950. It was the third tornado to strike Joplin since May 1971.

Meteorological synopsis

On the evening of May 21, an area of low pressure was centered over western South Dakota. This feature, in addition to steep lapse rates and dewpoints above , was conducive to the development of supercells later in the day. Very large hail was forecast, but the tornado threat was forecast to remain isolated. At 8:00 a.m. CDT (1300 UTC), the National Weather Service (NWS) Storm Prediction Center issued a slight risk of severe storms for much of the upper Plains and the Midwest.

By 8:00 a.m. CDT (1300 UTC) on May 22, forecasters at the SPC realized that a more intense weather outbreak was likely to occur, and upgraded a large swath of the Midwest to a moderate risk. The system was forecast to evolve into a wave early Monday morning as a trough strengthened from the western United States. At the surface, a cold front was forecast to pass through the region later in the day, while a dryline was forecast to intersect the cold front in Kansas. These features, accompanied by the low pressure system, encouraged very strong storm development along the cold front. By the 11:30 a.m. CDT (1630 UTC) updated outlook, certainty had grown stronger that a major severe weather event would occur that afternoon. A public severe weather outlook was issued at this time, and the outlook stated that severe weather was expected that afternoon, with tornadoes, large hail, and strong winds all named as threats.

At 1:30 p.m. CDT (1830 UTC), four hours prior to the tornado, the Storm Prediction Center issued a tornado watch for southwestern Missouri, to remain in effect until 9:00 p.m. CDT. The watch predicted "explosive thunderstorm development," with a “strong tornado or two possible." Thunderstorms began developing between 2:00 and 3:00 p.m. over southeast Kansas. They quickly became severe, and as thunderstorm development continued moving to the east, forecasters became more concerned about imminent tornado development. A tornado warning for the severe thunderstorm west of Joplin that eventually produced the EF5 tornado was first issued at 5:17 p.m. CDT (22:17 UTC), 17 minutes before it touched down and 19 minutes before it entered the city of Joplin.

Storm track and damage

Beginning
CDT (22:34 UTC). Eyewitnesses and storm chasers reported multiple vortices rotating around the parent circulation. Here, the tornado downed several large trees at EF0 intensity. Civil defense sirens sounded in Joplin twenty minutes before the tornado struck, in response to the tornado warning issued at 5:17 p.m. CDT (22:17 UTC) for northwestern Newton and southwestern Jasper counties in Missouri, and southeastern portions of Cherokee County, Kansas, but many Joplin residents did not heed the warning or the sirens.

The tornado moved east-northeast and strengthened to EF1 intensity as it continued through rural areas towards Joplin, snapping trees and power poles and damaging outbuildings. Widening, the tornado then tracked into the more densely populated southwest corner of the city near the Twin Hills Country Club. It heavily damaged several homes at a subdivision in this area at up to EF3 strength. The tornado continued to cause EF3 damage as it moved through another subdivision just east of Iron Gates Road. Numerous homes were destroyed and multiple vehicles tossed around, some of which were thrown onto or rolled into homes. The tornado reached EF4 intensity just before crossing S. Schifferdecker Ave.

EF5 intensity in Joplin
The now massive and wedge-shaped tornado then crossed S. Schifferdecker Ave. at 5:38 p.m. CDT (22:38 UTC), producing its first area of EF4 damage only four minutes after touching down, as several small but well-built commercial buildings were flattened. Consistent EF4 to EF5 damage was noted east of S. Schifferdecker Ave. and continued through most of southern Joplin. Numerous homes, businesses, and medical buildings were flattened in this area, with concrete walls collapsed and crushed into the foundations. A large steel-reinforced step and floor structure leading to a completely destroyed medical building was "deflected upward several inches and cracked". Steel trusses from some of the buildings were "rolled up like paper", and deformation or twisting of the main support beams was noted. Multiple vehicles were thrown and mangled or wrapped around trees nearby. Iowa State University wind engineer Partha Sarkar calculated the force needed to remove the parking stops from the lot and found that winds exceeding  would have been required.

Damage became remarkably widespread and catastrophic at and around the nearby St. John's Regional Medical Center, which lost nearly every window on three sides, interior walls, ceilings, and part of its roof; its life flight helicopter was also blown away and destroyed. Loss of backup power caused five fatalities, and the nine-story building was so damaged that it was deemed structurally compromised, and later torn down. According to the NWS office in Springfield, Missouri, such extreme structural damage to such a large and well-built structure likely indicated winds at or exceeding 200 mph. Vehicles in the hospital parking lot were thrown into the air and mangled beyond recognition, including a semi-truck that was tossed  and wrapped completely around a debarked tree. Small debris from the hospital, including X-rays, medical reports, and dental records, was found in Greene and Polk counties many miles to the east. Wind-rowing of debris was noted in this area, and more concrete parking stops were removed from the St. John's parking lot. Virtually every house near McClelland Boulevard and 26th Street was flattened; some were swept completely away, and trees sustained severe debarking.

Peak intensity

As the tornado tracked eastward, it maintained EF5 strength as it crossed Main Street (Route 43) between 20th and 26th Streets. It heavily damaged every business along that stretch and virtually destroyed several institutional buildings. It tracked just south of downtown, narrowly missing it. Entire neighborhoods were leveled in this area with some more homes swept away, and trees were stripped completely of their bark. At some residences, reinforced concrete porches were deformed or, in some cases, completely torn away. Damage to driveways was noted at some residences as well. Numerous vehicles were tossed up to several blocks, and a few homeowners never located their vehicles. A large church, a nursing home, Franklin Technology Center, St. Mary's Catholic Church and School, and Joplin High School were all destroyed along this corridor. The Greenbriar Nursing Home was completely leveled, with 21 fatalities occurring there alone. As the tornado crossed Connecticut Ave. further to the east, it destroyed several large apartment buildings, a Dillons grocery store, and a bank. Only the concrete safety deposit box vault remained at the bank, and a wooden 2x4 was found speared completely through a concrete curb at one location. Pieces of cardboard were found embedded in stucco walls that remained standing at Joplin High School. Steel beams and pieces of fencing were deeply embedded into the ground in fields near the high school, steel fence posts were bent to the ground in opposite directions, and a school bus was thrown into a nearby bus garage. The tornado then approached Range Line Road, the main commercial strip in the eastern part of Joplin, affecting additional neighborhoods along 20th Street.

The now heavily rain-wrapped tornado continued at EF5 intensity as it crossed Range Line Road. As the tornado hit the Pizza Hut at 1901 South Range Line Road, store manager Christopher Lucas herded four employees and 15 customers into a walk-in freezer. With difficulty closing the door, he wrapped a bungee cord holding the door shut around his arm until he was sucked out and killed by the tornado. The tornado completely destroyed a Walmart supercenter, a Home Depot, and numerous other businesses and restaurants in this area, many of which were flattened. Numerous metal roof trusses were torn from the Home Depot building and were found broken and mangled in nearby fields. Cars that originated at the Home Depot parking lot were found hundreds of yards away. An Academy Sports + Outdoors store along Range Line sustained major structural damage, and a chair was found impaled legs-first through an exterior stucco wall there. A nearby three-story apartment complex was also devastated, and two cell phone towers collapsed. In this area, numerous cars were thrown and piled on top of each other, 100-pound manhole covers were removed from roads and thrown, the ground scoured, and a Pepsi distribution plant was completely leveled. Additional calculations with regards to the manhole covers by Partha Sarkar revealed that winds had to have exceeded 200 mph for the manhole covers to be removed. Many fatalities occurred in this area, and the damage was rated as EF5.

Extreme damage continued in the area of Duquesne Road in southeast Joplin. Many houses and industrial and commercial buildings were flattened in this area as well. The industrial park near the corner of 20th and Duquesne was especially hard hit with nearly every building flattened. One of the many warehouses affected was a Cummins warehouse, a concrete block and steel building that was destroyed. The last area of EF5 damage occurred in the industrial park, and a nearby Fastrip gas station and convenience store was completely destroyed. Many homes were destroyed further to the east at EF3 to EF4 strength in a nearby subdivision, and East Middle School sustained major damage.

Weakening and dissipation
The tornado then continued on an east to east-southeast trajectory towards I-44 where it weakened; nonetheless, vehicles were blown off the highway and mangled near US 71 (exit 11 on what is now the I-49) interchange. The damage at and around the interchange was rated EF2 to EF3. The weakening tornado continued to track into the rural areas of southeastern Jasper County and northeastern Newton County where damage was generally minor to moderate, with trees, mobile homes, outbuildings, and frame homes damaged mainly at EF0 to EF1 strength. The tornado lifted east of Diamond at 6:20 p.m. CDT (23:20 UTC), according to aerial surveys. A total of 158 people were killed, and 1,150 others were injured along the path.

Aftermath and impact

A preliminary survey of the tornado damage by the NWS office in Springfield began on May 23. The initial survey confirmed a violent tornado rated as a high-end EF4.

The scope of the damage was immense: according to the local branch of the American Red Cross, about 25% of Joplin was destroyed, though emergency officials reported some level of damage to about 75% of the city. A week after the tornado, Joplin's mayor estimated that 25% of the businesses licensed in the city were damaged or destroyed.

Official accountings of the precise number of buildings damaged or destroyed vary somewhat. According to the National Institute of Standards and Technology (NIST) technical report, in total 7,964 buildings were damaged in Joplin, including 7,411 residential buildings and 553 non-residential. At least 3,734 of those buildings (including 3,181 of the residential and all 553 of the non-residential buildings) sustained so much damage as to be considered destroyed. According to a Federal Emergency Management Agency (FEMA) study, 8,264 homes were impacted, and of those,  3,884 were "significantly damaged" and 4,380 were destroyed.

Infrastructure 
The tornado also severely damaged critical infrastructure in the city, hampering emergency response and recovery efforts. Approximately 4,000 electricity distribution poles were damaged, more than 110 miles of distribution line brought down, 135 transmission towers "affected," and an electrical substation in the path of the tornado was completely destroyed (two more were damaged, but reparably so). In the immediate aftermath of the storm, approximately 20,000 people were left without power, and those with homes left intact could not get it restored until 10-12 days later, when their dwellings were approved for safe occupancy. The ultimate cost of rebuilding Joplin's damaged electricity system was calculated at $25.7 million.

The tornado also caused about 4,000 leaks in water service lines, dropping Joplin's water system pressure below operating level and necessitating a block-by-block effort to find and repair the service line leaks, with a water boil order issued for the entire city in the meantime. Water pressure was returned to normal outside of the damage area within 48 hours, and the water boil order was lifted after five and a half days. Approximately 3,500 gas meters and 55,000 feet of gas main were damaged, and it took two weeks to stem every gas leak; some damaged mains could not be shut off because they served critical facilities like Freeman Health System, the lone remaining hospital in Joplin. In east Joplin,  of anhydrous ammonia was released from a valve at a trucking facility and quickly contained; no significant toxic releases occurred.

With 21 cell towers down and fiber cables damaged, cellular communications—voice calls in particular, text messages less so—were heavily impeded. Temporary mobile cell towers were deployed by wireless carriers to fill the gap within 24 hours. By May 24, three towers owned by AT&T and Sprint had been restored.

Insurance
An early estimate from catastrophe risk modeling firm Eqecat, Inc. placed the insured losses from the tornado at one to three billion USD. By mid-June, more than 19,000 insurance claims had been filed, a number that eventually rose to 61,000, with a total payout of more than $2 billion—31% going to homeowners and 5% to those who lost vehicles. The impact on the insurance industry was not so much due to the number of claims, but the cumulative effect of such a large number of total losses. More than 2,500 local people employed in insurance were involved in some capacity. It was presumed that State Farm would assume the largest share of these losses, having market share of 27% for homeowners insurance and 21% for automobile insurance.

The $2.8 billion in damage is the largest amount for a tornado since 1950.

Casualties

As of May 2013, the official death toll from NWS was listed at 158 while the City of Joplin listed the death toll at 161 (158 direct). The list was up to 162, until one man's injuries were found to be unrelated to the event. In one indirect fatality, a policeman was struck by lightning and killed while assisting with recovery and cleanup efforts the day after the storm. Another five indirect fatalities occurred after a disease outbreak of mucormycosis infected 13 people, possibly 18 people. Shortly after the tornado, authorities had listed 1,300 people as missing, but the number quickly dwindled as they were accounted for. Many people were reported to have been trapped in destroyed houses. Seventeen people were rescued from the rubble the day after the tornado struck. Of 146 sets of remains recovered from the rubble, 134 victims had been positively identified by June 1. This total included four sets of partial remains, some of which may have been from a single person. On June 2, it was announced that four more victims had died.

Six people were killed when St. John's Regional Medical Center was struck by the tornado. Five of those deaths were patients on ventilators who died after the building lost power and a backup generator did not work. The sixth fatality was a hospital visitor.

The Joplin Globe reported that 54% of the people killed died in their residences, 32% died in non-residential areas and 14% died in vehicles or outdoors. Joplin officials after the tornado announced plans to require hurricane ties or other fasteners between the houses and their foundations (devices add about US$600 to the construction costs). Officials rejected a proposal to require concrete basements in new houses. Officials noted that as of 2009, only 28% of Joplin's new homes had basements, compared with 38% two decades before.

At least 1,150 people were injured severely enough to seek treatment at regional hospitals. Injuries ranged from cuts and bruises to impalement by large debris.

Officials said they rescued 944 pets and reunited 292 with owners.

Rating dispute

In 2013, the American Society of Civil Engineers published a study disputing the tornado's initial EF5 rating, based on surveying damage on over 150 structures within a six-mile segment of the storm's path. According to the report, over 83% of the damage was caused by wind speeds of 135 miles per hour or less, the maximum wind speed of an EF2 tornado. An additional 13% was caused by EF3 wind speeds, and 3% was consistent with EF4 winds. The study found no damage consistent with wind speeds over 200 miles per hour, the minimum threshold of an EF5 tornado. Researchers concluded that the inability to find EF5 damage was due to the absence of construction standards that were able to determine the necessary wind speeds. Bill Colbourne, a member of the engineering team that surveyed the damage, declared that "a relatively large number of buildings could have survived in Joplin if they had been built to sustain hurricane winds."

However, the EF5 rating stood. The NWS office in Springfield stated that their survey teams found only a small area of EF5 structural damage, and that it could have easily been missed in the survey (at and around St. John's Medical Center). Bill Davis, head of Springfield's NWS office, said that the results of the study "do not surprise me at all," adding that "there was only a very small area of EF5 damage in Joplin...we knew right off the bat there was EF4 damage. It took us longer to identify the EF5 damage and that it would take winds of over 200 miles per hour to do that damage." Additionally, the basis for the EF5 rating in Joplin was mainly contextual rather than structural, with non-conventional damage indicators such as the removal of concrete parking stops, manhole covers, reinforced concrete porches, driveways, and asphalt used to arrive at a final rating. The presence of wind rowed structural debris, instances of very large vehicles such as buses, vans, and semi-trucks being thrown hundreds of yards to several blocks from their points of origin, the fact that some homeowners never located their vehicles, and the overwhelming extent and totality of the destruction in Joplin were also taken into consideration.

Response

Immediately following the disaster, emergency responders were deployed within and to the city to undertake search and rescue efforts. Governor Jay Nixon declared a state of emergency for the Joplin area shortly after the tornado hit, and ordered Missouri National Guard troops to the city. By May 23, Missouri Task Force One (consisting of 85 personnel, four dogs, and heavy equipment) arrived and began searching for missing persons. Five heavy rescue teams were also sent to the city a day later. Within two days, numerous agencies arrived to assist residents in the recovery process. The National Guard deployed 191 personnel and placed 2,000 more on standby to be deployed if needed. In addition, the Missouri State Highway Patrol provided 180 troopers to assist the Joplin Police Department and other local agencies with law enforcement, rescue, and recovery efforts that also included the deployment of five ambulance strike teams, and a total of 25 ambulances in the affected area on May 24 as well over 75 Marines from the Ft. Leonard Wood Army base. Due to the severe damage caused by the tornado, the traveling Piccadilly Circus was unable to perform as scheduled. As a result, the circus employees brought their two adult elephants to help drag damaged automobiles and other heavy debris out of the streets.

In May 2012, the Missouri National Guard released documents showing that four soldiers looted consumer electronics from a ruined Walmart during efforts to locate survivors the day after the tornado. According to the investigative memo, they believed the merchandise was going to be destroyed. All four soldiers were demoted and had letters of reprimand placed in their personnel files, but were never prosecuted, though many civilian looters were.

Cleanup 
The Joplin tornado generated an estimated 3 million cubic yards of debris, an amount sufficient to cover a football field 120 stories high. Removal efforts lasted for months, and at their height more than 410 trucks a day transported debris to landfills in Joplin itself, as well as nearby Galena and Lamar.

The tornado also led to renewed lead contamination on many Joplin properties. Joplin had been the site of lead mining and processing for decades before cleanup efforts began in the mid-1990s, and the tornado's upheaval of the surface as it swept houses from foundations and uprooted trees recontaminated about 40% of yards in southern Joplin, leaving behind chunks of raw lead ore the size of tennis or golf balls. The city spent more than $5 million to clean the properties up using grants from the Environmental Protection Agency, scraping off the topsoil and replacing it with clean soil, and further required that builders in the damage area test for lead and clean it up before construction.

Social media response
The tornado also highlighted a new form of disaster response, using social media. This type of disaster response is now known as Social Media Emergency Management. News outlets began aggregating images and video from eyewitnesses shared through social media. Public citizen-led Facebook groups and web sites coordinated information, needs, and offers. The results were so effective the project became a finalist in the 2011 Mashable Awards for Best Social Good Cause Campaign.

National attention 

President Barack Obama toured the community on May 29, flying into Joplin Regional Airport and speaking at a memorial at the Taylor Performing Arts Center at Missouri Southern State University about two miles (3 km) north of the worst of the devastation. Obama had been on a state visit to Europe at the time of the storm. Members of the controversial Westboro Baptist Church were also scheduled to protest the same day in Joplin, but they did not show up. There was a massive counterprotest that was organized in response to the Westboro protest, in which thousands of protesters showed up holding signs saying, "God Loves Joplin" and "We Support You Joplin."

President Obama also delivered the commencement address at Joplin High School on May 21, 2012, a year after the tornado.

Rebuilding and recovery 

FEMA maintained a large presence in Joplin for a period following the tornado, with as many as 820 employees working in the city. One FEMA undertaking was the construction of 15 temporary housing sites in and around Joplin, which housed 586 families/households at their peak.

The city, warned by federal officials that it should expect to lose 25% of its population following the tornado, responded quickly and built an average of five houses a week between 2011 and 2022. The majority of businesses reopened, and more than 300 new businesses opened between 2011 and early 2016.

In April 2012, Joplin voters approved a $62 million bond to continue constructing new schools and repair damaged existing ones.

Engineers criticized the tilt-up construction of the Home Depot building, in which all but two of the walls collapsed in a domino effect after the tornado lifted the roof, killing seven people in the front of the store (although 28 people in the back of the store survived when those walls collapsed outwards). Home Depot officials said they disagreed with the study published by The Kansas City Star and said they would use the tilt up practice when they rebuilt the Joplin store. On June 1, the Home Depot said it would have a new temporary  building erected and operational within two weeks. In the meantime, it opened for business in the parking lot of its demolished building. On June 20, the Home Depot opened a temporary  building constructed by the company's disaster recovery team.

Within two years, the city's workers and community groups compiled and published "Joplin Pays it Forward" to give recovery advice to other places struck by disasters, which has since been downloaded more than 900 times. Many homes and businesses have been rebuilt since the tornado. Joplin High School was reopened on September 2, 2014. St. John's Regional Medical Center (now Mercy Hospital) had to be rebuilt and was reopened in 2015.

Mental health impacts 
Eighteen people committed suicide in the wake of the tornado, according to the executive director of the Community Clinic of Southwest Missouri, a co-chair of the city's long-term recovery team. Calls about domestic violence grew in the year following the disaster.

In popular culture 
A number of documentaries have been produced about the Joplin tornado and its effects on the city. These include Heartland: A Portrait of Survival, directed by Erica Tremblay and featured at the Omaha Film Festival and the St. Louis International Film Festival, as well as Deadline in Disaster (directed by Beth Pike), which followed the staff of The Joplin Globe in the tornado's aftermath and received a regional Emmy in the Documentary-Cultural category during the 37th Mid-America Emmy Awards.

In October 2011, The Joplin Globe released a hard-cover pictorial book entitled 32 Minutes in May: The Joplin Tornado.

See also

List of North American tornadoes and tornado outbreaks
List of F5 and EF5 tornadoes
List of tornadoes causing 100 or more deaths
Tornado intensity and damage
Tornado records

Notes

References

Further reading

External links
Tornado, Joplin, Missouri, 2011 from (National Institute of Standards and Technology)
NOAA's Aerial Survey of Joplin, Missouri
Time-lapse visualization of the May 22 tornado outbreak
Radar loop of the Joplin tornado
Slideshow of damage from the tornado

OPT: One Year After the Joplin Tornado

F5 tornadoes by date
Tornadoes in Missouri
05-22
2011 tornado
Tornado,2011-05-22,Joplin
Joplin Tornado2011-05-22
Joplin Tornado,2011-05-22